Moussa Savadogo is a Burkinabé writer and playwright. He was one of the most important playwrights in Burkinabé theatre following independence and became well known throughout the 1960s and 1970s in Burkina Faso.

Notable works include Fille de le Volta (Daughter of the Volta) and L'oracle (The Oracle).

References

Burkinabé dramatists and playwrights
20th-century dramatists and playwrights
Living people
Year of birth missing (living people)
21st-century Burkinabé people